Lesbian, gay, bisexual, and transgender (LGBT) persons in  Vanuatu may face legal challenges not experienced by non-LGBT residents. Same-sex sexual activity is legal, but households headed by same-sex couples are not eligible for the same legal protections available to opposite-sex married couples.

In 2011, Vanuatu signed the "joint statement on ending acts of violence and related human rights violations based on sexual orientation and gender identity" at the United Nations, condemning violence and discrimination against LGBT people.

VPride Foundation is a Vanuatuan human rights group that advocates for LGBT rights, freedom of speech and freedom of religion. The group, established in 2009, has organised many events to raise awareness of LGBT people in Vanuatu. Some of these events have been attended by government officials.

Law regarding same-sex sexual activity
Same-sex sexual activity is legal in Vanuatu. Since the Penal Code (Amendment) Act 2006 commenced in 2007, the age of consensual sex in Vanuatu has been 15 years regardless of sex or sexual orientation.

Recognition of same-sex relationships
Vanuatu does not recognise same-sex unions in any form.

In October 2013, the Minister for Internal Affairs issued a warning which said that pastors are not allowed to preside over same-sex marriages.

In June 2014, the Vanuatu Law Commission discussed the issue of same-sex marriage, noting developments in neighbouring Australia and especially New Zealand. The Commission noted that the Marriage Act (Cap 60) does not in its current form prohibit the recognition of same-sex marriages (neither does it expressly permit them). It also stated that legalizing same-sex marriage would allow LGBT people to "fulfil their sexual preference or sexual orientation without repression or fear of being prosecuted", but found that religious opposition to legalization would be high.

Discrimination protections
There is no legal protection against all forms of discrimination based on sexual orientation or gender identity.

There is no general prohibition of employment discrimination based on sexual orientation in Vanuatu. However, Section 18.2(f) of the Teaching Service Act 2013 establishes the obligation of the Vanuatu Teaching Service Commission not to discriminate in recruitment, promotion, professional development, transfer and all other aspects of the management of its employees on the basis of "sexual preference".

The Right to Information Act 2016 gives Vanuatu citizens the right to access government-held documents, including documents held by ministries and government departments, statutory and regulatory bodies, public hospitals, local government councils, and any organizations providing public service and receiving government funds. Certain types of documents not available to the public include those containing "personal information", which is defined by the Act as "[...] information relating to the race, gender, sex, marital status, national, ethnic or social origin, colour, sexual orientation, age, physical or mental health, well-being, disability, religion, conscience, belief, culture, language and birth of the person; [...]".

Social conditions
Vanuatu is a socially conservative country. Gay and lesbian travellers (and citizens) are advised to avoid public displays of affection. There is no active gay scene in Vanuatu.

The International Day Against Homophobia, Transphobia and Biphobia was first celebrated in Vanuatu in 2016. The event was organised by VPride Foundation. In October 2016, the group, in correlation with other human rights groups including Vanuatu Women's Centre, held a workshop on LGBT rights and women's rights. The Minister of Health attended the event, and discussed issues such as better access to healthcare for people living with HIV/AIDS.

Summary table

See also

Human rights in Vanuatu
LGBT rights in Oceania

References

External links
 

LGBT in Vanuatu
Vanuatu
Society of Vanuatu
Human rights in Vanuatu